is a 2017 Japanese comedy film directed by Akira Nagai and based on the manga series of the same name written by Usamaru Furuya.

Plot
The Kaitei Supreme High School is the most famous aristocratic high school in Japan. Only 800 students in the whole Japan can have opportunities to study here. Because of the robust support of Japanese commercial circles and political world in this school, the person who becomes the president of the student union will be a member of the council of ministers and have the chance to participant in the politics. But it is not that easy to become the leader of school union; the precondition is that you must be the class monitor at The Kaitei Supreme High School.

In the April of this year, the new school term starts. The first year student at The Kaitei Supreme High School, Teiichi Akaba with his childhood dream which is to become the prime minister of Japan becomes the monitor of class one successfully. Also, Teiichi Akaba’s father is a dignitary in the political circle. Then Teiichi Akaba decides to take part in the campaign of student union’s president. However, he must face other powerful competitors' challenge. One of the main competitor, Kikuma Tōgō is the monitor of class two, and he is the son of Teiichi Akaba’s father’s political mortal enemy. The other competitor is the monitor of class three, Dan Ōtaka. He has excellent academic grades and actually comes from the lower middle class of society.

The ambitious Teiichi Akaba starts his political career by supporting the second year student Roland Himuro who is the monitor of class six to become the president of the student union. The dominant competitor of Roland Himuro is the monitor of class five, Okuto Morizono. In the student convention of school, Teiichi Akaba offers a proposal of being the flag raiser to Roland Himuro. During the conference, Kikuma Tōgō tries to cut the line of the flag in order to cast blame on Teiichi Akaba. However, his trickery not prevailed successfully. After this accident, Teiichi Akaba earns the trust of Roland Himuro.

In the future, Teiichi Akaba must try his best on strategy, on the social network and on academic grades. He even wants to sacrifices his life fighting against his enemies. Many unpredictable betrays and traps are waiting for him. The battle on The Kaitei Supreme High school started.

Cast
 Masaki Suda as Teiichi Akaba
 Shūhei Nomura as Kikuma Tōgō
 Ryoma Takeuchi as Dan Ōtaka
 Shotaro Mamiya as Roland Himuro
 Jun Shison as Kōmei Sakakibara
 Yudai Chiba as Okuto Morizono
 Mei Nagano as Mimiko Shiratori
 Katsuhiro Suzuki as Mitsuhiko Koma
 Ryo Kimura as Keigo Dōyama
 Amane Okayama as Yōsuke Sasaki
 Kazuhiro Yamaji as Usaburō Tōgō, Kikuma's father
 Sei Matobu
 Ikuji Nakamura
 Takaaki Enoki as the prime minister
 Kōtarō Yoshida as Jōsuke Akaba, Teiichi's father

Awards

Reception
The film had earned ¥214 million (US$1.9 million) and ranked #4 in the Japanese Box Office.

References

External links
 

2017 films
Japanese comedy films
2017 comedy films
Live-action films based on manga
Toho films
2010s Japanese films
2010s Japanese-language films